St. Vincent's College may refer to:
 St Vincent's College, Potts Point, New South Wales
 St. Vincent's College, Bridgeport, Connecticut
 DePaul University, Chicago, Illinois; founded as St. Vincent's College in 1898, renamed in 1907

See also
 Saint Vincent College, Latrobe, Pennsylvania
 Saint Vincent's College, Zamboanga del Norte, Philippines
 St Vincent College, Gosport, Hampshire, England
 Loyola Marymount University, Los Angeles, California, founded as St. Vincent's College